Agarista may refer to:

 Alternative spelling of Agariste, a name from Greek mythology
 Agarista (moth), a genus of moths in the family Noctuidae
 Agarista (plant), a genus of plants in the family Ericaceae

Genus disambiguation pages